Michael Wayne Dimmel  (born October 16, 1954) is a retired professional baseball player who played 3 seasons in Major League Baseball. He was originally drafted by the Los Angeles Dodgers in the 6th round of the 1973 Major League Baseball Draft. He was later drafted by the Baltimore Orioles from the Dodgers in the 1976 Rule V Draft. After two seasons with the Orioles he was traded to the St. Louis Cardinals for Benny Ayala.  Dimmel played high school baseball at Logansport High School for Coach Jim Turner and Butch Jones.

Dimmel is currently a Senior Vice President of Investments with Morgan Stanley out of its Dallas office. He began his business career as a financial adviser with Underwood Neuhaus in 1985.

References

1954 births
Living people
Major League Baseball outfielders
Baltimore Orioles players
St. Louis Cardinals players
Ogden Dodgers players
Waterbury Dodgers players
Bakersfield Dodgers players
Albuquerque Dukes players
Charlotte O's players
Miami Orioles players
Rochester Red Wings players
Arkansas Travelers players
Springfield Redbirds players
Columbus Clippers players
Baseball players from Minnesota
People from Albert Lea, Minnesota